Return to Yggdrasill, in addition to being a song off the band's 2004 Isa album, is also a 2005 DVD release by the Norwegian metal band Enslaved, consisting primarily of concert footage recorded in Bergen, Norway. The material on this set focuses primarily on songs from the preceding album, Isa.

Track listing
 "Intro" – 0:29
 "Bounded by Allegiance" – 6:13
 "Ascension" – 6:32
 "The Voices" – 5:59
 "Lunar Force" – 6:53
 "Isa" – 3:35
 "Jotunblod" – 4:16
 "Return to Yggdrasill" – 6:15
 "The Crossing" – 9:59

Enslaved (band) video albums
2005 video albums